Night Warriors is a novel by Graham Masterton published in 1986.

Plot summary
Night Warriors is a novel in which dangerous creatures prey on the living.

Reception
Dave Langford reviewed Night Warriors for White Dwarf #86, and stated that "nasty all right, but short on stuff like suspense, coherence, credibility."

Reviews
Review by Gary Zacharias (1987) in Fantasy Review, March 1987
Review by Don D'Ammassa (1987) in Science Fiction Chronicle, #96 September 1987
Review by Lee Montgomerie (1987) in Interzone, #20 Summer 1987
Review [French] by Jérôme-Olivier Allard (2009) in Solaris, #172

References

1986 novels